Wu Yan (Chinese: 吴龑; Pinyin: Wú Yǎn; born 7 January 1989 in Jiangdu) is a Chinese football player who currently plays for Dalian Professional in the Chinese Super League.

Club career
Wu was promoted to Chinese Super League side Wuhan Optics Valley's first team squad in 2007. He played as the fourth choice goalkeeper of the team. Wuhan Optics Valley withdrew from the top tier for what it claimed was unfair punishment by the Chinese Football Association on 1 October 2008, after a scuffle broke out on the field in one of their matches. 

He joined Hubei Greenery which used the Wuhan U-19 team as well as Hubei youth team as the foundation for the squad in 2009. He made 10 appearances for Hubei in the 2010 China League Two without conceding a goal, including two legs of the Semi-finals which Hubei Greenery beat Hangzhou Sanchao 1–0 and promoted to China League One. Wu appeared in every minute of the 2012 league season, playing in all 30 League One games for Wuhan Zall as the club achieved runners-up in the league and promoted to Chinese Super League.

On 13 January 2015, Wu transferred to Chinese Super League side Henan Jianye. He would make his debut in a league game on 8 March 2015 against Tianjin TEDA in a 3-1 victory. He would initially struggle to establish himself throughout the season and lost his position to Han Feng, however the Head coach Jia Xiuquan kept faith with him and the following season he would establish himself as the clubs first choice goalkeeper. After several seasons with Henan he would be replaced by Wang Guoming as the team's first choice goalkeeper and Wu was allowed to leave to join second tier club Shaanxi Chang'an Athletic on 28 April 2022.

Career statistics 
Statistics accurate as of match played 31 December 2022.

References

External links
 

1989 births
Living people
Sportspeople from Yangzhou
Chinese footballers
Footballers from Jiangsu
Wuhan Guanggu players
Wuhan F.C. players
Henan Songshan Longmen F.C. players
Chinese Super League players
China League One players
China League Two players
Association football goalkeepers